The Commemorative Medal for Foreign Operations or Missions is a military decoration of Belgium. It was established on 13 April 1993 and is awarded to military and civilian members of the Belgian Armed Forces who participated in operations or missions outside of the territory of Belgium.

Insignia 
The medal is circular and is struck from bronze, the obverse bears the Escutcheon-only version of the Coat of arms of Belgium under the royal crown and surrounded by the text Missions ou opérations à l'étranger - Buitenlandse opdrachten of operaties. The reverse of the medal bears a laurel crown along the outer circumference.  The blank area within the wreath may be used to engrave the recipients' name and date of the award. The ribbon is golden with three thin longitudinal stripes of black, green and black near the outer edges. 

The ribbon is adorned with an Arabic numeral that denotes the number of operations or missions the recipient has participated in. Prior to 2004, the various operations or missions the recipient had participated in were denoted by small bronze clasps bearing the name of the operation or mission like for the Commemorative Medal for Armed Humanitarian Operations.

Award Conditions
The Commemorative Medal for Foreign Operations or Missions is awarded to military and civilian members of the Belgian Armed Forces who participated in good standing, in humanitarian, peacekeeping, peace enforcement or international security operations or missions outside the territory of Belgium for a minimum duration of one month. The list of the operations for which the medal is awarded is included in a separate Ministerial Decree (see references), which is amended on a regular basis. 

As for the Commemorative Medal for Armed Humanitarian Operations, Belgium does not award different medals for each operation. If a person participated in more than one such operation, they receive the Commemorative Medal for Foreign Operation or Mission for each of these operations, the number of award being represented by the number displayed on the ribbon. 

The award of the medal is not automatic. In order to be awarded the medal, one meeting the award prerequisites must request it. The medal is awarded by the Human Resources Department of the Belgian Armed Forces. In the period 2009-2013, the Commemorative Medal for Foreign Operation or Mission was awarded 12,659 times.

See also

 List of Orders, Decorations and Medals of the Kingdom of Belgium

References 
 Royal Decree of 13 April 1993 Creating a Commemorative Medal for Foreign Operation or Mission
 Ministerial Decree of 29 June 1994 Defining the Missions and Operations Taken into Consideration for the Award of the Commemorative Medal for Foreign Operation or Mission
 Belgian military regulation DGHR-REG-DISPSYS-001 of 20 February 2006
 Quinot H., 1950, Recueil illustré des décorations belges et congolaises, 4e Edition. (Hasselt)
 Cornet R., 1982, Recueil des dispositions légales et réglementaires régissant les ordres nationaux belges. 2e Ed. N.pl.,  (Brussels)
 Borné A.C., 1985, Distinctions honorifiques de la Belgique, 1830-1985 (Brussels)
 Report of written questions and answers in the Belgian House of Representatives, 17 March 2014 (QRVA 53-152)

External links
 Commemorative Medal for Foreign Operations or Missions

1993 establishments in Belgium
Military awards and decorations of Belgium
Military of Belgium
Awards established in 1993